Riki Dwi Saputro (born 20 February 1995) is an Indonesian professional footballer who plays as a forward or attacking midfielder for Liga 1 club PSS Sleman.

Club career

Persekat Tegal
In 2021, Riki Saputro signed a contract with Indonesian Liga 2 club Persekat Tegal. He made his league debut on 27 September 2021 in a match against Badak Lampung at the Gelora Bung Karno Madya Stadium, Jakarta.

PSS Sleman (loan)
He was signed for PSS Sleman to play in Liga 1 in the 2021 season, on loan from Liga 2 club Persekat Tegal. Riki made his league debut on 7 January 2022 in a match against Persiraja Banda Aceh at the Ngurah Rai Stadium, Denpasar. He also scored his first goal for the team in 18th minute.

Career statistics

Club

References

External links
 Riki Dwi Saputro at Soccerway
 Riki Dwi Saputro at Liga Indonesia

1995 births
Living people
Indonesian footballers
Liga 2 (Indonesia) players
Liga 1 (Indonesia) players
PSPS Riau players
PSS Sleman players
Association football forwards
Sportspeople from Riau